Brodal  is a surname. Notable people with this surname include:

Alf Brodal, Norwegian professor
Per Alf Brodal, Norwegian professor
Gerth Stølting Brodal
Svein Erik Brodal (born 1939), Norwegian actor, poet, novelist, and politician

See also

Bredahl
Bredal
Brodahl